Nicholas Jones may refer to:

Entertainment
Nicholas Jones (actor) (born 1946), British actor
Nick Jones (writer) (born 1978), Alaskan-born playwright, screenwriter, and performer
Nic Jones (born 1947), British folk singer and guitarist
Nicky Wire (Nicholas Jones, born 1969), member of the Manic Street Preachers

Sports
Nick Jones (American football) (born 1985), American football center for the Detroit Lions
Nick Jones (basketball) (born 1945), NBA and ABA player
Nick Jones (ice hockey) (born 1990), American ice hockey defenceman

Other
Nicholas Jones (politician) (died 1695),  represented Naas in the Irish House of Commons
Nicholas Jones (journalist) (born 1942), British political & industrial relations journalist
Nick Jones (entrepreneur) (born 1963), owner of Babington House, founder of Soho House and husband of broadcaster Kirsty Young

See also
Nick Farr-Jones (born 1962), former Australian rugby union footballer